Energy independence is independence or autarky regarding energy resources, energy supply and/or energy generation by the energy industry.

Energy dependence, in general, refers to mankind's general dependence on either primary or secondary energy for energy consumption (fuel, transport, automation, etc.). In a narrower sense, it may describe the dependence of one country on energy resources from another country.

Energy dependence has been identified as one of several factors (energy sources diversification, energy suppliers diversification, energy sources fungibility, energy transport, market liquidity, energy resources, political stability, energy intensity, GDP) negatively contributing to energy security.
Generally, a higher level of energy dependence is associated with higher risk, because of the possible interference of trade regulations, international armed conflicts, terrorist attacks, etc.

Techniques for energy independence

Renewable energy 

A study found that transition from fossil fuels to renewable energy systems reduces risks from mining, trade and political dependence because renewable energy systems don't need fuel – they depend on trade only for the acquisition of materials and components during construction. Renewable energy is found to be an efficient way to ensure energy independence and security. It also supports the transition to a low carbon economy and society. Ways to manage the variability of renewable energy – such as little solar power on cloudy days – include dispatchable generation and smart grids. Bioenergy hydropower and hydrogen energy could be used for such purposes alongside storage-options like batteries.

Nuclear power 
Several countries are conducting extensive research and development programs around renewable energy sources like solar, wind, water, and nuclear energy in hopes to achieve energy independence. However, because solar, wind, and water cannot always be derived as an energy source, nuclear energy is seen as a near-universal alternative that is efficient, safe, and combats the climate crisis.

Under the conceived notion that the expansion of and investment in nuclear energy power plants is a key step in the goal of achieving energy independence many countries, and companies, are supporting nuclear power research efforts.

The International Thermonuclear Experimental Reactor (ITER), located in France, is an experimental tokamak nuclear fusion reactor that is a collaboration between 35 different countries. This project was launched in 2007 and still under construction today.

In 2020, the U.S. Department of Energy awarded $160 million in initial funding to TerraPower and X-energy to build advanced nuclear reactors that will be affordable to construct and operate. Both companies are expected to produce their product within 7 years.

In that same tone, there are several other companies and institutions across the globe that are gaining attention from their nuclear power innovations and research efforts. Commonwealth Fusion Systems, founded in 2018, is focusing on the development of nuclear fusion. In 2020, The Energy Impact Center launched its OPEN100 project, the world's first open-source blueprint for the design, construction, and financing of nuclear power plants. General Fusion is a Canadian company currently developing a fusion power device, based on magnetized target fusion. Flibe Energy aims to tackle the future of nuclear energy by researching and developing the liquid fluoride thorium reactor (LFTR).

In addition, safe and cost-effective storage of nuclear waste in the Waste Isolation Pilot Plant and full version of this underground storage in New Mexico is important for the nuclear fuel cycle.

Global examples 
Energy independence is being attempted by large or resource-rich and economically-strong countries like the United States, Russia, China and the Near and Middle East, but it is so far an idealized status that at present can be only approximated by non-sustainable exploitation of a country's (non-renewable) natural resources. Another factor in reducing dependence is the addition of renewable energy sources to the energy mix. Usually, a country relies on local and global energy renewable and non-renewable resources, a mixed-model solution that presumes various energy sources and modes of energy transfer between countries like electric power transmission, oil transport (oil and gas pipelines and tankers), etc. The European dependence on Russian energy is a good example because Russia is Europe's main supplier of hard coal, crude oil, and natural gas. Oil wars in and between the Middle East, Russia, and the United States that have made markets unpredictable and volatile are also a great example as to why energy advocates and experts suggest countries invest in energy independence. The international dependence of energy resources exposes countries to vulnerability in every aspect of life — countries rely on energy for food, infrastructure, security, transportation, and more.
	 
In the Scottish Independence debate, energy independence is a key argument in favour of Scottish exit. Since the discovery of large oil fields, pro-independence proponents have used the tagline "It's Scotland's Oil" in campaigns. Scottish oil and gas production constitutes 82% of the UK's oil and gas. Accordingly, economic and political independence would be followed by high-stakes energy agreements, wherein some argue the fiscal power would lie with Scotland. Political independence would supposedly return decisions about the future of energy to the Scottish people, who are more likely to vote in favour of renewable energy on Scottish soil. Therefore, less reliance on international gas supplies, and a focus on low-emission local energy is a key tenet of the "Building a New Scotland" prospectus promoting Scottish Independence.

See also

Related concepts
Energy resilience
Energy security
Energy development
Efficient energy use

National efforts
 Making Sweden an Oil-Free Society
 United States energy independence
 Energy policy of Turkey
 India's three-stage nuclear power programme
Phase-out of fossil fuel vehicles

References

External links
 https://www.iea.org/publications/freepublications/publication/KeyWorld_Statistics_2015.pdf 

Energy economics